Ousdal is a surname. Notable people with the surname include:

Mads Ousdal (born 1970), Norwegian actor
Sverre Anker Ousdal (born 1944), Norwegian actor, father of Mads

Norwegian-language surnames